Camille Jourdheuille (1830–1909) was a French entomologist.

Jourdheuille was a Member of the Société académique d'agriculture, des sciences, arts et belles-lettres
du département de l'Aube and of the Société entomologique de France
(Président, 1892).
He was a judge in Paris spending the summer months in Lusigny.
Jourdheuille  wrote:
Liste des Microlépidoptères recueillis dans le département de l'Aube.Troyes. 1865 (in collaboration with Jules Joseph Ray).
Catalogue des Lépidoptères du département de l'Aube, Mémoires de la Société Académique de l'Aube 1883

References
Lhoste, J. 1987 Les entomologistes français. 1750-1950. INRA (Institut National de la Recherche Agronomique ), Paris : 1-355.

French entomologists
Presidents of the Société entomologique de France
1830 births
1909 deaths